Albin Vilho Manner (4 April 1888, Jääski – 8 July 1954) was a Finnish politician. He served as Deputy Minister of Defence from 4 to 10 July 1930 and as Minister of Defence from 10 July 1930 to 21 March 1931. He was a Member of the Parliament of Finland from 1917 to 1927 and again from 1929 to 1933, representing the Agrarian League.

References

1888 births
1954 deaths
People from Vyborg District
People from Viipuri Province (Grand Duchy of Finland)
Centre Party (Finland) politicians
Ministers of Defence of Finland
Members of the Parliament of Finland (1917–19)
Members of the Parliament of Finland (1919–22)
Members of the Parliament of Finland (1922–24)
Members of the Parliament of Finland (1924–27)
Members of the Parliament of Finland (1929–30)
Members of the Parliament of Finland (1930–33)
People of the Finnish Civil War (White side)